Nostradamus Ate My Hamster is a fantasy novel by British author Robert Rankin. In it, several seemingly unconnected and nonsensical events come together to make perfect clarity at the end; these include time travel and an attempted alien invasion vaguely orchestrated by Hitler.

The plot centers on the aptly named Russell Nice, stuck in a dead-end job at a movie prop selling business, discovering holographic equipment from the future that allows the holder to create lifelike holograms of any movie star they want. Eventually, he becomes entangled in a mass of deceit, lies, and betrayal, all of which centers on a demon-god with an insect face, and Hitler, who is stuck in the present time with his SS bodyguards, intending to make a film that will influence the world to follow Hitler and his ideals. During his time travel, Russell discovers that the creature has disposed of traditional heroes Jim Pooley and John Omally before its attack; they would normally defend Brentford from the threat the creature posed, but as it exists outside the natural order it is able to destroy them before they can take action against it.

Finding himself unable to simply destroy the film or prevent it being made, Russell decides to use the time-travel belts that Hitler's forces had acquired to establish himself as a major film producer in the present, thus ensuring that he will be the one that Hitler's men bring the film to, allowing him to destroy it before it is released. This victory, due to the temporally active nature of the conflict, apparently erases Russell's struggle, and the novel ends with Jim Pooley and John Omally discussing the story in the Flying Swan as a man who appears to be Russell enters the bar, and begins to talk with an attractive waitress.

References

Novels by Robert Rankin
1996 British novels
British fantasy novels
Holography in fiction
Novels about time travel
Doubleday (publisher) books